Nils Karlsson Pyssling is a 1990 Swedish family film based on the short story with the same name by Astrid Lindgren.

Cast 
Oskar Löfkvist as Bertil
Jonatan Lindoff as Nils
Britta Pettersson as Mother
Charlie Elvegård as Father
Ulla Sallert as Hulda

External links 

Swedish fantasy films
1990s Swedish-language films
1990 films
Films based on works by Astrid Lindgren
Swedish children's films
1990s Swedish films